Ilias G. Kafetzis was a Greek athlete.  He competed at the 1896 Summer Olympics in Athens. Kafetzis was one of 17 athletes to start the marathon race.  He was one of the seven runners that dropped out of the race.

References

External links

Year of birth missing
Year of death missing
Greek male marathon runners
Greek male long-distance runners
Olympic athletes of Greece
Athletes (track and field) at the 1896 Summer Olympics
19th-century sportsmen
Place of birth missing
Place of death missing